The Archaeological Museum of Piraeus contains mainly sculptures, discovered in Piraeus and in the area of the Attic coast from Bronze Age to Roman times,

Collections

The museum's displayed objects are divided in sections:

Prehistoric collection (Mycenaean)
Pottery collection
Bronze statues
A reconstruction of a typical Classical sanctuary (Cybele's)
Classical gravestones
Large funerary monuments
Hellenistic sculptures
Roman sculptures

The building
The old building of the museum (330 m2 ), which is currently used as a storage room, was built in 1935. The new two-store building, which was inaugurated in 1981, covers a total area of total 1.394 m2. Both buildings neighbour on the Zeas ancient classical theater. In the near future, the theater site is going to be used as an open-air sculpture exhibition.

Visitors information
The museum is accessible with the Athens metro or bus lines. It is 15-minute walk from Piraeus station and a couple minute walk from bus station. Moreover, it is a 5-minute walk from the area for the reception of Cruise ships of the Piraeus port.

Gallery

See also
List of museums in Greece
Ancient Greek art
Ancient Greek sculpture
Pottery of ancient Greece

References

External links

 Municipality of Piraeus
Hellenic Ministry of Culture and Tourism
Municipality of Piraeus
Archaeological Museum of Piraeus - Ebook by Latsis Foundation
www.athensinfoguide.com
  Piraeus Museum information

 
Museums in Piraeus
Piraeus